Medicine Hat/Schlenker Airport  is a registered aerodrome located near Medicine Hat, Alberta, Canada.

See also
Medicine Hat Airport

References

External links
Place to Fly on COPA's Places to Fly airport directory

Registered aerodromes in Alberta
Cypress County